Pseudeuophrys is a genus of jumping spiders that was first described by Friedrich Dahl in 1912. The name is a combination of the Ancient Greek "pseudo-", meaning "false", and the salticid genus Euophrys. It was briefly synonymized with Euophrys, but this decision was later reversed.

Species
 it contains ten species, found only in Europe, Asia, and the United States:
Pseudeuophrys erratica (Walckenaer, 1826) (type) – Europe, Turkey, Caucasus to East Russia, China, Korea, Japon. Introduced to USA
Pseudeuophrys iwatensis (Bohdanowicz & Prószyński, 1987) – Russia (Far East), China, Korea, Japan
Pseudeuophrys lanigera (Simon, 1871) – Europe, Turkey, Caucasus. Introduced to USA
Pseudeuophrys nebrodensis Alicata & Cantarella, 2000 – Spain, Italy (Sicily)
Pseudeuophrys obsoleta (Simon, 1868) – Europe, Turkey, Caucasus, Russia (Europe to Far East), Central Asia, China
Pseudeuophrys pascualis (O. Pickard-Cambridge, 1872) – Israel
Pseudeuophrys perdifumo van Helsdingen, 2015 – Italy
Pseudeuophrys rhodiensis Schäfer, 2018 – Greece (Rhodes)
Pseudeuophrys talassica (Logunov, 1997) – Kyrgyzstan
Pseudeuophrys vafra (Blackwall, 1867) – Azores, Madeira, Europe (Portugal to Russia)

References

External links
 Photograph of P. vafra
 Photography of P. lanigera

Salticidae genera
Palearctic spiders
Salticidae
Spiders of Asia
Taxa named by Friedrich Dahl